The 2018 TCU Horned Frogs football team represented Texas Christian University in the 2018 NCAA Division I FBS football season. The 123rd TCU football team played as a member of the Big 12 Conference and played their home games at Amon G. Carter Stadium, on the TCU campus in Fort Worth, Texas. They were led by 18th-year head coach Gary Patterson. They finished the season 7–6, 4–5 in Big 12 play to finish in a tie for fifth place. They were invited to the Cheez-It Bowl where they defeated California.

Previous season
The Horned Frogs finished the 2017 season with a No. 9 national ranking and an 11–3 record. The Frogs dropped both a regular season game in Norman and the Big 12 Championship Game to Big 12 champion Oklahoma. TCU defeated Stanford in the Alamo Bowl.

Recruiting

Position key

Recruits

The Horned Frogs signed a total of 22 recruits.

Preseason

Award watch lists
Listed in the order that they were released

Big 12 media poll
The Big 12 media poll was released on July 12, 2018 with the Horned Frogs predicted to finish in third place.

Schedule

Schedule Source:

Personnel

Roster

Game summaries

Southern

at SMU

vs. Ohio State

at Texas

Iowa State

Texas Tech

Oklahoma

at Kansas

Kansas State

When the two Big 12 conference teams that both wear purple got together for the 2018 matchup, Kansas State lost  quarterback Skylar Thompson to an injury in the first quarter and the Wildcats wen to backup Alex Delton.  Kansas State kept the game close but missed a PAT leaving the score 14-13 in favor of TCU.  "Of course I feel horrible for him," Snyder said. "He's one of the young guys. He didn't lose the ballgame for us. There were a bunch of us that made mistakes that contributed."  With the loss, K-State was left in a position to win the last three games in order to be eligible for post-season bowl games.

at West Virginia

at Baylor

Oklahoma State

vs. California–Cheez-It Bowl

Statistics

Scoring
Scores against non-conference opponents

Scores against the Big 12

Scores against all opponents

Rankings

Honors and awards

Preseason awards 
 Ben Banogu (DL)
Preseason Big 12 Defensive Player of the Year 
Preseason All-Big 12
 KaVontae Turpin (WR/KR/PR) 
Preseason All-Big 12 (Return Specialist)

Players drafted into the NFL

References

TCU
TCU Horned Frogs football seasons
Guaranteed Rate Bowl champion seasons
TCU Horned Frogs football